Dracula bella is a species of orchid endemic to Colombia.

References

bella
Endemic orchids of Colombia
Plants described in 1878